Riot is an elite-level women's ultimate team based in Seattle, Washington. Riot was founded in 2000, after the previous top-level women's team in Seattle, Women on the Verge, disbanded. They were the women's champions at the 2004 and 2005 UPA Club Championships (now USA Ultimate). They have also won the WFDF World Ultimate Club Championships in 2002 and 2014.

Seattle Riot is coached by Andy Lovseth, Gwen Ambler, and Rohre Titcomb, and is captained by Alyssa Weatherford, Bailey Zanhiser, and Julia Snyder.

There have been three individual winners of the Kathy Pufahl Spirit Award from Seattle Riot: Gwen Ambler (2011), Kati Halmos (2005), and Vida Towne (2004). Additionally, Riot has won the team spirit award three times in 2015, 2013, and 2006.

Community Involvement 
Seattle Riot participates in numerous community efforts. Riot player Hana Kawai founded the All Girl Everything Ultimate Program (AGE UP) to "build power among young people of color, particularly girls, in Seattle’s South End". Former player Shannon O'Malley is the director of DiscNW Summer Eastside Youth Ultimate Camp, and many current players coach at that camp. Former player and current coach Gwen Ambler founded the Seattle Women's winter league.

Team history

References

External links 
 Official web site

Sports in Seattle
Ultimate (sport) teams
2000 establishments in Washington (state)
Ultimate teams established in 2000